Maharani Kishori ( 18th century) was the wife of Maharaja Suraj Mal of Bharatpur in Rajasthan, India. She came from Hodal, a town situated in the Palwal district of Haryana (on National Highway No.2), near Mathura and Bharatpur. The house that her husband built for her in Bharatpur is now a monument protected by the government of Rajasthan.

It is said that the Maharaja was riding his elephant near Hodal when he saw an angry bull frightening people. Kishori was returning from the well with a pitcher on her head, and stepped onto the bull's bridle to control it. The Maharaja was impressed by her courage and beauty, and later sent his messenger to make an offer of marriage. They married in  1730.

Kishori is described as "a symbol of pride for the local populace" who "played the role of patron to the Bharatpur state for three generation[s]".

The Maharani Kishori Memorial College of Education in Hodal is named after her, as is the Maharani Kishori Devi Girls' School in Bikaner.

See also
Maharaja Suraj Mal
Jawahar Singh
Bharatpur State

References

Sources
Kalika Ranjan Qanungo: History of the Jats : Contribution to the History of Northern India (Up to the Death of Mirza Najaf Khan, 1782). Edited and annotated by Vir Singh. Delhi, Originals, 2003,  
Dr. Prakash Chandra Chandawat: Maharaja Suraj Mal aur unka yug, Jaypal Agencies Agra, 1982
Kunwar Natwar Singh: Maharaja Suraj Mal

External links
Birth place of Maharani Kishori

Year of birth missing
Year of death missing
Indian female royalty
Jat rulers
People from Faridabad district
History of Bharatpur, Rajasthan
16th-century Indian women
16th-century Indian people